Syntonic is the second album by Canadian synthpop group Kon Kan, released in 1990 by Atlantic Records.  Syntonic was the first Kon Kan album to solely feature Barry Harris; Kevin Wynne had departed the previous year.

Two singles were released from the album: "Liberty!" and "(Could've Said) I Told You So", the latter featuring a recreation of Jimmy Soul's 1963 number one hit, "If You Wanna Be Happy".

"Time" features a recreation of Canadian band Trooper's "We're Here For A Good Time (Not A Long Time)".

Four songs were co-written with Bob Mitchell, who had also co-written Cheap Trick's 1988 number one hit, "The Flame", and songs on Kon Kan's previous album.

Four tracks were produced or co-produced by renowned disco producer John Luongo, who had also worked with Blancmange in the early 1980s.

Two tracks were co-produced by Paul Robb, a member of Minnesota band Information Society.

"Victim" was originally a 1978 Candi Staton single.  The Kon Kan version was originally conceived as a duet featuring Tim Curry and Carole Pope.

Track listing
"Liberty!" – 4:59 (Barry Harris, Bob Mitchell)
"(Could've Said) I Told You So" – 4:07 (Barry Harris, Bob Mitchell)
"Victorious" – 4:59 (Barry Harris, Chrissie Lomax, R. Bertola)
"Time" – 5:19 (Barry Harris, Bob Mitchell)
"Heaven Knows (I'm Missing You)" – 4:57 (Barry Harris, Bob Mitchell)
"Victim" – 6:48 (Dave Crawford)
"I'll Find Another Love" – 3:55 (Barry Harris, C. Dixon)
"My Camera (Oh How I Wish)" – 4:42 (Barry Harris, Bob Mitchell)
"Can't Stop The Fire" – 4:40 (Barry Harris, Chrissie Lomax, Scott Humphrey)
"Better Day" – 4:11 (Barry Harris, Bob Mitchell)

Personnel
Barry Harris – lead and backing vocals, keyboards and programming
Paul Robb – keyboards and programming
Gregge Tupper – keyboards and programming
Martyn Phillips – keyboards and programming
Joy Winter – lead vocals
Carole Pope – lead vocals
India – lead vocals
MC Protege – rap
Debbe Cole – backing vocals
Harriet Harrison – backing vocals
Gordon Grody – backing vocals
Julia Waters – backing vocals
Maxine Waters – backing vocals
Jon Lind – backing vocals
Chrissie Lomax – backing vocals
Paul Pesco – guitar
A.K. Eye – drums
Al S. Ess – drums and percussion
Danny Wilensky – saxophone

References 

1990 albums
Kon Kan albums
Atlantic Records albums